Touched by the Crimson King is the second album by the power metal supergroup Demons and Wizards, released in June 2005. The album contains a cover of Led Zeppelin's "Immigrant Song." It was also released as a limited edition digipak in Europe with an alternate cover and four bonus tracks on a second disc. For the North American release, all fourteen songs appeared on one disc, which had the limited edition cover in the form of a sleeve around the jewel case.

It appeared on the American Billboard charts on place 35.

Track listing

Personnel
Hansi Kürsch - vocals
Jon Schaffer - lead, rhythm, bass, and acoustic guitars

Guest musicians
Bobby Jarzombek - drums and percussion
Jim Morris - guitar solos and backing vocals
Rubin Drake - bass and fretless bass guitar
Howard Helm - piano and backing vocals
Kathy Helm - backing vocals
Tori Fuson - backing vocals
Jesse Morris - backing vocals
Krystyna Kolaczynski - cello

Lyrical content
"Crimson King" is a reference to the Crimson King, the main antagonist of The Dark Tower series. The song also strongly references Randall Flagg, one of the King's many servants. Hansi in an interview has also stated that the Crimson King is Satan.
"The Gunslinger" is referring to Roland of Gilead, the protagonist of the Dark Tower series. The song refers mainly to the plot of the final book of the series.
"Terror Train" is a reference to Blaine the Mono, from the third and fourth novels of the Dark Tower series.
"Beneath These Waves" is based on Herman Melville's Moby Dick.
"Seize the Day" is based on Tolkien's The Lord of the Rings.
"Love's Tragedy Asunder" is about a man whose wife is terminally ill, and he assists her suicide, and ends up killing himself.
"Wicked Witch" is about the Wicked Witch of the West from L. Frank Baum's The Wizard of Oz.
"Dorian" is about Oscar Wilde's novel The Picture of Dorian Gray.
"Down Where I Am" is about a baby born with Down syndrome and the struggle of his father and the emotions going in and out of his mind.

References

2005 albums
Demons and Wizards (band) albums
Albums recorded at Morrisound Recording
The Dark Tower (series)
Adaptations of works by Stephen King